Henry Cordner (17 June 1885 – 14 November 1943) was an Australian rules footballer who played with both the Melbourne Football Club and the Melbourne University Football Club in the Victorian Football League (VFL).

Family 
The son of Edward James Cordner, and Helen Cordner, née Rae, Henry Cordner was born in Bendigo on 17 June 1885. He died in Hobart on 14 November 1943.

Harry's brother Ted Cordner, and his cousins Alan Cordner and "Larry" Cordner, also played senior VFL football. Harry is the uncle of the Cordners – Don, Denis, Ted and John – who played for Melbourne in the 1940s.

Education
Henry entered into residence at Trinity College, Melbourne in 1904, graduating with a M.B., Ch.B. from the University of Melbourne in 1909.

Football
He played VFL football for both Melbourne and University.

Military service
Overseas at the time that war broke out, Dr. Henry Cordner was commissioned as a lieutenant in the Royal Army Medical Corps, on 16 August 1914, promoted to captain on 16 August 1916, and served in France.

See also
 List of Australian rules football families

Footnotes

References
 Holmesby, Russell & Main, Jim (2007). The Encyclopedia of AFL Footballers. 7th ed. Melbourne: Bas Publishing.
 
 Personal: Dr. Henry Cordner, The Argus, (Saturday, 29 August 1914), p.17.

External links

 Harry Cordner, demonwiki.org.

1885 births
University Football Club players
Melbourne Football Club players
1943 deaths
Australian rules footballers from Bendigo
People educated at Melbourne Grammar School
Australian military personnel of World War I